Onthophagus striatulus is a species of dung beetle in the family Scarabaeidae. It is found in North America.

Subspecies
These two subspecies belong to the species Onthophagus striatulus:
 Onthophagus striatulus floridanus Blatchley, 1928
 Onthophagus striatulus striatulus (Palisot de Beauvois, 1809)

References

Further reading

 

Scarabaeinae
Articles created by Qbugbot
Beetles described in 1809